Theriognathus (from Greek therion: beast, mammal, Greek, gnathos, “jaw,” +us, pronounced THEH-ree-OG-nah-thuss) is an extinct genus of therocephalian therapsid belonging to the family Whaitsiidae, known from fossils from South Africa, Zambia, and Tanzania. Theriognathus has been dated as existing during the Late Permian. Although Theriognathus means mammal jaw, the lower jaw is actually made up of several bones as seen in modern reptiles, in contrast to mammals. Theriognathus displayed many different reptilian and mammalian characteristics. For example, Theriognathus had canine teeth like mammals, and a secondary palate, multiple bones in the mandible, and a typical reptilian jaw joint, all characteristics of reptiles. It is speculated that Theriognathus was either carnivorous or omnivorous based on its teeth, and was suited to hunting small prey in undergrowth. This synapsid adopted a sleek profile of a mammalian predator, with a narrow snout and around 1 meter long. Theriognathus is represented by 56 specimens in the fossil record.

Geography

Theriognathus is represented by abundant occurrences in the Karoo Basin of South Africa, sequestered records in the Upper Permian Ruhuhu Basin of Tanzania, Zambia, and Russia. Late Permian therapsids are best known from the Karoo Basin, which covers a massive area and provides Permian sediments that total 12 km in thickness. During the Late Permian, sediments were fed into the Karoo Basin from a ring of mountains that encircled Southern Gondwana (an ancient supercontinent, partly located on what is now South America and Antarctica) In the Karoo is the Beaufort Group, a subdivision of the basin. This division is further broken down into assemblage zones, intervals of geological strata that are defined based on the distributions of previously found tetrapod taxa.

Theriognathus has been found in  the Wuchiapingian, upper Tropidostoma, Cistecephalus, and lower Dicynodon assemblage zones in the Upper Permian, Karoo Basin, South Africa; Wuchiapingian, Cistecephalus assemblage zones in the Upper Permian, Ruhuhu Basin, Tanzania; Wuchiapingian Cistecephalus assemblage zones in the Upper Permian, Luangwa Basin, Zambia; the Wuchiapingian, Upper Permian, Kotelnich, Kirov region, Russia;, the Changxingian Archosaurus assemblage zone, Upper Permian, Vladimir region, Russia.

Theriognathus was also found in the Tapinocephalus assemblage zone, which was an odd find since most specimen in that zone tend to be medium to large in size. Theriognathus was an exception to that norm. Diversification was shown by an increase in richness of eutherocephalian groups in the Cistecephalus and Dicynodon assemblage zones. During this time some of the more specialized genera, including Theriognathus, split from pre-existing families.

History of discovery
Theriognathus was first described by Sir Richard Owen in 1876 based on specimens that were discovered and donated by A.G. Bain from South Africa. The specimens (consisting of therocephalians, including Theriognathus) were described and illustrated in “Catalogue of the Fossil Reptiles of South Africa in the Collections of the British Museum,” by Owen. Theriognathus was considered a dicynodont at that time. In 1950, Von Huene described two Theriognathus skulls (whatsiids Notosollasia and Notaelurops, now synonymous with Theriognathus), from the Upper Permian Ruhuhu Basin of Tanzania. In 1980, most whaisiid genera were combined with Theriognathus, creating two species. Theriognathus major was the new species name that included Whaitsia major, and Theriognathus laticeps was the new species that included Notosollasia laticeps. Whaitsia, Alopecopsis, Notosallasia, Hyenosaurus, Moshorhynchus, Notaelurops, and Aneugomphius  have been synonymized with Theriognathus. These genera were linked due to lack of postcanine teeth.

Results from the analysis of a basal cynodont, Charassognathus gracilis, from the Late Permian Tropidostoma Assemblage Zone, South Africa, supported an original hypothesis of T.S. Kemp’s concept of Therocephalia being paraphyletic, placing Cynodontia as the sister taxon to Theriognathus. This was significant in the relationship of Theriognathus and cynodonts, as well as being the first computer assisted cladistics analysis to support the possible paraphyletic relationship of Therocephalia. A few authors have supported this phylogenetic hypothesis, based on the existence of an enlarged epiterygoid and a quadrate notch in the squamosal.

Description/paleobiology

Skull

Skull roof
 
The anterodorsal-most tip of the premaxilla forms a rostral process, which overhangs the incisors, like in most eutherocephalians. The external nares are relatively large and face anterolaterally. The rostrum is relatively long and about as high as it is broad. A constriction of the snout exists directly behind the caniniforms, causing the snout to look relatively narrow. The posterior region of the maxillary facial plate is folded inward onto the palatal region, like in most non-akidnognathid whaitsioids. The suborbital bar is deep and slightly expanded. It extends from the jugal onto the posterior end of the maxillary facial plate, creating orbital convergence and appearing more triangular than circular in dorsal view. The orbit is positioned relatively high in the skull. There is a postorbital process on the jugal. The zygomatic arch is very slender. The parietal borders the temporal fenestra dorsally and is expanded posteriorly on the midline of the parietal foramen.</ref> The parietal crest is usually quite long., another trait shared with non-akidnognathid whaitsioids. The quadrate and quadratojugal are reduced in height, and situated in the depression on the anterior face of the squamosal. There is no nasal-lacrimal contact and no prefrontal-postorbital contact in adults.

Palate
The palatal fenestra of the lower caniniform merges with the internal naris. A portion of the vomer separates the choanae, and bears specialized transverse processes just anterior to the contact with the premaxilla. The vomers are either fused anteriorly or completely fused. No palatine teeth have ever been found on specimens of Theriognathus. The pterygoid flange expansion is severe, and looks like posteriorly protruding wings with a slight posterolateral tilt, a character shared with most therocephalians. The interpterygoid vacuity of Theriognathus adults is either absent or extremely reduced. Theriognathus shares this character with Moschowhaitsia, and is convergent in scylacosaurids.

Lower jaw
The dorsal process of the stapes  in Theriognathus is greatly reduced or entirely absent. The dentary is short, shaped like a banana, and continuously tapers anteriorly to a narrow edge. The dentarys’ lateral surface is smooth. The posterodorsal terminal end of the coronoid process is more rounded, and the dorsal extent terminates below the middle of the orbit in adults. The postdentary bones are reduced to form a free standing coronoid process. The reflected lamina is spade shaped and does not extend below the dentary. The area between left and right dentaries remains relatively long and narrow just posterior to symphyseal region.

Teeth
 
Theriognathus has five or fewer interlocking incisors, which have longitudinal grooves. There are four lower incisors. The incisors are relatively straight and conical. There are no functional upper postcanines and the upper canine is large in adults. The incisor cutting margins are smoothly ridged. Lower canines are large in adults, and post-canine teeth exist in the lower jaw.

Post-cranial
The pubis and ischium alignment is horizontal, with a wide puboischiatic plate.

Bone histology
Ricqlès (1969) suggested differential rates of growth between a basal therocephalian from the Middle Permian of South Africa and the Late Permian whaitsiid ‘Notosollasia’ (now synonymous with Theriognathus). According to Ricqlès, Theriognathus’ radius midshaft bone wall is extremely thick and has a reduced central cavity without cancellous structures. The vascular motif is primarily longitudinal and radial. Ricqlès suggested that therocephalians might have exhibited accelerated growth rates later in their evolutionary history due to the comparatively more vascularized cortical bone in the radius of the whaitsiid.

The femur bears a relatively thick wall as well, and could be related to impact loading, due to its orientation. The thick cortical bone is made many primary osteons in a parallel and woven fibered matrix. There are numerous osteocyte lacunae that have a spherical shape within the growth zones, but more lenticular and ordered near growth marks. The cortex has a moderate amount of vascularization. The pattern and number of the growth marks indicated some amount of plasticity in the growth style of Theriognathus.

Classification
In 1980, most whaitsiid genera were synonymized with Theriognathus, creating two new species. Theriognathus major was the new combination for Whaitsia major, and Theriognathus laticeps was the new combination for Notosollasia laticeps. Whaitsiids like Theriognathus were once thought to be closely related to cynodonts, and were even thought to be ancestral to Cynodontia. A 2008 study found Therocephalia to be paraphyletic and placed Theriognathus as the sister-group to Cynodontia. In 2009, another phylogenetic analysis of therocephalians found that the group was monophyletic and placed Theriognathus in a deeply nested position within the clade.

References

Lopingian synapsids of Africa
Whaitsiids
Fossil taxa described in 1876
Taxa named by Richard Owen
Wuchiapingian genus first appearances
Wuchiapingian genus extinctions